Phrynus operculatus is a species of tailless whipscorpion in the family Phrynidae.

Description 
This species is of medium size, measuring 18–22 mm in total length. It is of chestnut color, slightly reddish on the carapace and the pedipalps; the front area is moderately narrow, with the front edge gently bilobed. The basal segment of the chelicerae has an external tooth. Pedipalps have four anterior spines in the trochanter. In the female, the gonopods appear with the sclerite relatively short, wide in the base and with the apex narrow and curved towards the ventral surface.

Distribution 
This species is distributed in the United States in the state of Texas and in Mexico in the states of Nuevo León, Sinaloa, Nayarit, Jalisco, Guanajuato, Colima, Michoacán, Guerrero, Morelos, Oaxaca and Chiapas.

Habitat 
This species, having a wide distribution, seems to have great ecological plasticity. It has been found under stones, under semi-shed tree bark, and under dry cacti in xerophilous forests.

References 

Amblypygi
Articles created by Qbugbot
Animals described in 1902
Arachnids of North America
Arthropods of Mexico